Mrigen Talukdar  (born 29 December 1984) is an Indian cricket player who played for  Assam in the Ranji Trophy. He was right-hand batsman and right-arm medium bowler. Talukdar has played thirteen Ranji Trophy matches for Assam.

Talukdar represented India Under-15 team in the year 1999–00 in Asia Cup tournament as a vice-captain in Malaysia. He also represented India Under-15 team in U-15 World Cup, in the year 2000 in England.

References

External links
 

Living people
1984 births
Indian cricketers
Assam cricketers
Cricketers from Assam